What The Funny was an urban comedy digital media company founded by comedian Marlon Wayans and Funny or Die co-founder Randy Adams. The studio was located on the lot at Sunset Gower Studios.

The site had partnerships with former American Idol contestant and YouTube star Todrick Hall and Houston rapper Trae tha Truth.

References

External links

Mass media companies of the United States
American comedy websites